MK3 may refer to:

 Mortal Kombat 3, the third game in the Mortal Kombat series
 Mario Kart: Super Circuit, the third game in the Mario Kart series, released in 2001 for the Game Boy Advance

See also 
 Mark III (disambiguation)